Voyager is an album released by heavy metal band Manilla Road in 2008.

Track listing
 "Tomb of the Serpent King / Butchers of the Sea" - 9:02
 "Frost and Fire" - 6:02
 "Tree of Life" - 8:00
 "Blood Eagle" - 6:11
 "Voyager" - 9:31
 "Eye of the Storm" - 4:40
 "Return of the Serpent King" - 8:04
 "Conquest" - 4:37
 "Totentanz (The Dance of Death)" - 7:57

Credits
 Mark Shelton - vocals, electric guitar, 6- and 12-string acoustic guitars, synthesizers, Cathedral organ
 Cory Christner - drums
 Harvey Patrick - bass guitar, backing vocals

References

Manilla Road albums
2008 albums